Esam Ayashi (born 15 April 1999) is an Israeli footballer who plays as a defender for Hapoel Baqa al-Gharbiyye.

References

1999 births
Living people
Israeli footballers
Footballers from Kabul, Israel
Maccabi Netanya F.C. players
Hapoel Marmorek F.C. players
Ironi Tiberias F.C. players
Hapoel Ironi Baqa al-Gharbiyye F.C. players
Liga Leumit players
Association football defenders